Brajesh Yadav is an Indian politician and member of the Legislative Assembly of Uttar Pradesh, representing the Sahaswan constituency. In 2022, Brijesh Yadav of the Samajwadi Party won the seat by defeating Haji Vittan Musarrat from Bahujan Samaj Party.

References 

Indian politicians
Living people
Date of birth unknown